is a railway station in the city of Fuji, Shizuoka Prefecture, Japan, operated by the private railway operator Gakunan Railway.

Lines

Station layout
Sudo Station has one side platform serving a single bi-directional track. The station is unattended.

Adjacent stations

Station history
Sudo Station was opened on January 20, 1953.

Passenger statistics
In fiscal 2017, the station was used by an average of 90 passengers daily (boarding passengers only).

Surrounding area
 Nakasato Bus Stop

See also
 List of Railway Stations in Japan

References

External links

 Gakunan Electric Train official website 

Railway stations in Shizuoka Prefecture
Railway stations in Japan opened in 1953
Fuji, Shizuoka